George Hampel AM QC was a Justice of the Supreme Court of Victoria from 1983 to 2000, having previously practised as a barrister since 1958.

Early life

Hampel was born in Poland just prior to World War II, the son of Polish Jews. His family escaped Poland to spend the wartime years in Russia. Although his immediate family survived the Holocaust, much of his extended family did not.

When the war ended, he moved with his family to France, and then eventually to Australia. He was then educated at Melbourne High School and the University of Melbourne.

Career 
Hampel has held numerous positions in the legal profession, such as Vice-President of the Law Council of Australia, Vice-Chairman of the Victorian Bar Institute and Chairman of the Constitution Commission of Victoria, for which he received a Centenary Medal. 

Since 2000, he has been Professor of Trial Practice and Advocacy at Monash University, and Chairman of the Legal Practice Board of Victoria. He is also President of the International Institute of Forensic Studies. He is considered a leader in the teaching of advocacy, and together with his wife, has trained war crime prosecutors at The Hague.

In 2006, he was appointed a Member of the Order of Australia.

Personal life

Hampel is married to County Court of Victoria judge Felicity Hampel SC, with whom he often teaches. They have two children:

 Hampel's son, Antony Hampel, an event coordinator, was the de facto partner of Phoebe Handsjuk, who plunged to her death in the garbage chute of their luxury apartment in Melbourne, in 2010, aged 24. Despite a coroner's finding in 2014 that the death was a sleepwalking accident caused by a combination of depression, alcohol, and Stilnox, many questions remain.
 Hampel's daughter, Kristina Hampel, escaped conviction in 2014 for selling cocaine and possessing a can of tear gas.

References

External links
 Official website 

Judges of the Supreme Court of Victoria
Australian legal scholars
Academic staff of Monash University
Living people
Year of birth missing (living people)
Australian Senior Counsel
Members of the Order of Australia
Recipients of the Centenary Medal
20th-century Australian judges
People educated at Melbourne High School
University of Melbourne alumni
Polish emigrants to Australia
Australian people of Polish-Jewish descent